The Jacobite rising of 1715 (
or 'the Fifteen') was the attempt by James Edward Stuart (the Old Pretender) to regain the thrones of England, Ireland and Scotland for the exiled Stuarts.

At Braemar, Aberdeenshire, local landowner the Earl of Mar raised the Jacobite standard on 27 August. Aiming to capture Stirling Castle, he was checked by the much-outnumbered Hanoverians, commanded by the Duke of Argyll, at Sheriffmuir on 13 November. There was no clear result, but the Earl appeared to believe, mistakenly, that he had won the battle, and left the field. After the Jacobite surrender at Preston (14 November), the rebellion was over.

Background

The 1688 Glorious Revolution deposed James II and VII, who was replaced by his Protestant daughter Mary II and her Dutch husband William III, ruling as joint monarchs. Shortly before    William's death in March 1702, the Act of Settlement 1701 definitively excluded Catholics from the throne, among them James’s son, James Francis Edward Stuart. Since his Protestant half-sister Anne had no surviving children, the Act named her successor as the distantly related, but Protestant, Sophia of Hanover, who died two months before Anne in August 1714. This made her eldest son George I of Great Britain, and gave the pro-Hanoverian Whigs control of government for the next 30 years.

French support had been crucial for the Stuart exiles, but their acceptance of the Protestant succession in Britain was part of the terms that ended the 1701–1714 War of the Spanish Succession. This ensured a smooth inheritance by George I in August 1714, and the Stuarts were later banished from France by the terms of the 1716 Anglo-French Treaty. The 1710–1714 Tory government had actively prosecuted their Whig opponents, who now retaliated, accusing the Tories of corruption: Robert Harley was imprisoned in the Tower of London while Lord Bolingbroke escaped to France and became James' new Secretary of State.

On 14 March 1715, James appealed to Pope Clement XI for help with a Jacobite rising: "It is not so much a devoted son, oppressed by the injustices of his enemies, as a persecuted Church threatened with destruction, which appeals for the protection and help of its worthy pontiff". On 19 August, Bolingbroke wrote to James that "..things are hastening to that point, that either you, Sir, at the head of the Tories, must save the Church and Constitution of England or both must be irretrievably lost for ever". Believing the great general Marlborough would join him, on 23 August James wrote to the Duke of Berwick, his illegitimate brother and Marlborough's nephew, that; "I think it is now more than ever Now or Never".

Raising the standard

Despite receiving no commission from James to start the rising, the Earl of Mar sailed from London to Scotland, and on 27 August at Braemar in Aberdeenshire held the first council of war. On 6 September at Braemar, Mar raised the standard of "James the 8th and 3rd", acclaimed by 600 supporters.

Parliament responded with the Habeas Corpus Suspension Act of 1715, and passed an Act that confiscated the land of rebelling Jacobite landlords in favour of their tenants who supported the London government. Some of Mar's tenants travelled to Edinburgh to prove their loyalty to the Hanoverian crown and acquire title to Mar's land.

Struggle for Scotland
In northern Scotland, the Jacobites were successful. They took Inverness, Gordon Castle, Aberdeen and further south, Dundee, although they were unable to capture Fort William. In Edinburgh Castle, the government stored arms for up to 10,000 men and £100,000 paid to Scotland when she entered the Union with England. Lord Drummond, with 80 Jacobites, tried under the cover of night to take the Castle, using a ladder. However, the ladder proved to be too short, leaving them stranded until morning, at which point they were discovered and arrested. It was subsequently alleged that this plot was organised by Dr. William Arthur, the King's Botanist and brother-in-law of prominent Scottish Whig, Unionist and Hanoverian Sir John Clerk, Baron Clerk.

By October, Mar's force, numbering nearly 20,000, had taken control of all Scotland above the Firth of Forth, apart from Stirling Castle. However, Mar was indecisive, and the Jacobite capture of Perth and the move south by 2,000 men were probably at the initiative of subordinates. Mar's hesitation gave the Hanoverian commander, the Duke of Argyll, time to increase his strength with reinforcements from the Irish Garrison.

On 22 October, Mar received his commission from James appointing him commander of the Jacobite army. His forces outnumbered Argyll's Hanoverian army by three to one, and Mar decided to march on Stirling Castle. On 13 November the two forces joined battle at Sheriffmuir. The fighting was indecisive, but near the end the Jacobites numbered 4,000 to Argyll's 1,000. Mar's force began to advance on Argyll, who was poorly protected, but Mar did not close in, possibly believing that he had won the battle already (Argyll had lost 660 men, three times as many as Mar). Instead, Mar retreated to Perth. On the same day as the Battle of Sheriffmuir, Inverness surrendered to Hanoverian forces, and a smaller Jacobite force led by Mackintosh of Borlum was defeated at Preston.

England
Amongst the leaders of a Jacobite conspiracy in western England were three peers and six MPs. The government arrested the leaders, including Sir William Wyndham, on the night of 2 October, and on the following day easily obtained Parliament's legitimation of these arrests. The government sent reinforcements to defend Bristol, Southampton and Plymouth. Oxford, famous for its monarchist sentiment, fell under government suspicion, and on 17 October General Pepper led the dragoons into the city and arrested some leading Jacobites without resistance.

Though the main rising in the West had been forestalled, a planned secondary rising in Northumberland went ahead on 6 October 1715, including two peers of the realm, James Radclyffe, 3rd Earl of Derwentwater, and William Widdrington, 4th Baron Widdrington, and a future peer, Charles Radclyffe, later de jure 5th Earl of Derwentwater. Another future English peer, Edward Howard, later 9th Duke of Norfolk, joined the rising later in Lancashire, as did other prominent figures, including Robert Cotton, one of the leading gentlemen in Huntingdonshire.

The English Jacobites joined with a force of Scottish Borderer Jacobites, led by William Gordon, 6th Viscount Kenmure, and this small army received Mackintosh's contingent. They marched into England, where the Government forces caught up with them at the Battle of Preston on 12–14 November. The Jacobites won the first day of the battle, killing large numbers of Government forces, but Government reinforcements arrived the next day and the Jacobites eventually surrendered.

On 15 November 3,000 Dutch troops arrived on the Thames and some time later another 3,000 landend in Hull. With this act of support, the Dutch fulfilled their part of the Barrier Treaty, which stated that the Dutch would provide 6,000 troops to defend the 'Protestant Succession.' This act of friendship forced George I to back the Dutch against the Emperor on the implemantation of the Barrier, something George had sought to avoid. With both Maritime Powers drawing a unified line against Austria, the barrier negotiations were quickly concluded to the Dutch Republic's satisfaction. Dutch troops took part in some minor actions in Scotland.

Aftermath

On 22 December, James landed in Scotland at Peterhead, but by the time he arrived at Perth on 9 January 1716, the Jacobite army numbered fewer than 5,000. In contrast, Argyll's forces had acquired heavy artillery and were advancing quickly. Mar decided to burn a number of villages between Perth and Stirling to deprive Argyll's army of supplies. On 30 January, Mar led the Jacobites out of Perth; on 4 February James wrote a farewell letter to Scotland, sailing from Montrose the following day.

Many Jacobite prisoners were tried for treason and sentenced to death. On 14 May 1716, Henry Oxburgh was hanged, drawn and quartered at Tyburn. The Indemnity Act of July 1717 pardoned all those who had taken part in the Rising, but the whole of Clan Gregor, including Rob Roy MacGregor, was specifically excluded from the benefits of that Act.

In later years, James, now known as the Old Pretender, made two more attempts at the British throne. In 1719, despite Spanish support, he was again defeated in the Battle of Glenshiel. James's son Charles Edward Stuart, the Young Pretender, attempted to win the throne for his father in 1745, but was defeated at the Battle of Culloden. James died in 1766.

See also
 Kingdom of Great Britain#George I: 1714–1727

Notes

References
 John Baynes, The Jacobite Rising of 1715 (London: Cassell, 1970).
 H. T. Dickinson, Bolingbroke (London: Constable, 1970).
 Christoph v. Ehrenstein, 'Erskine, John, styled twenty-second or sixth earl of Mar and Jacobite duke of Mar (bap. 1675, d. 1732)', Oxford Dictionary of National Biography, Oxford University Press, 2004; online edn, January 2008, accessed 20 January 2011.
 George Hilton Jones, The Main Stream of Jacobitism  (Cambridge, MA: Harvard University Press, 1954).
 Wolfgang Michael, England Under George I. The Beginnings of the Hanoverian Dynasty (Westpoint, CT: Greenwood, 1981).
 Stuart Reid, Sheriffmuir 1715. Frontline Books, 2014.
 
 Jonathan Oates, DUTCH FORCES IN EIGHTEENTH-CENTURY BRITAIN: A BRITISH PERSPECTIVE, Journal of the Society for Army Historical Research, Vol. 85, No.341 (Spring 2007), pp. 20-39

External links
 1715 Rebellion on the UK Parliamentary website

Further reading
 Daniel Szechi, 1715: The Great Jacobite Rebellion (Yale University Press, 2006).

 
1715 in Scotland
1715 in Great Britain
1716 in Scotland
1716 in Great Britain
James Francis Edward Stuart